Luleå Municipality is a municipality in Norrbotten County in northern Sweden. Its seat is located in Luleå, which is also the county seat of Norrbotten County.

Localities

There are 18 localities (or urban areas) in Luleå Municipality:

The municipal seat in bold

Sister cities
Luleå Municipality has five sister cities:
 Tromsø, Norway
 Kemi, Finland
 Murmansk, Russia
 Zenica, Bosnia and Herzegovina
 Puerto Cabezas, Nicaragua

See also
 Hertsön (district)
 List of islands of the Luleå archipelago

References

External links

 www.lulea.se
 Luleå University of Technology (LTU)

 
Luleå
Municipalities of Norrbotten County